HD 164922 is a seventh magnitude G-type main sequence star in the constellation of Hercules. To view it, binoculars or a telescope are necessary, as it is too faint to be visible to the naked eye. It is  distant from the Earth. It will soon evolve away from the main-sequence and expand to become a red giant.

Nomenclature 

The name HD 164922 derives directly from the fact that the star is the 164,922nd star listed in the Henry Draper catalog. The designation b for its planet derives from the order of discovery. The designation of b is given to the first planet found orbiting a given star, followed by the other lowercase letters of the alphabet. In the case of HD 164922, only one was discovered, which was designated b, followed by three more planets, which were designated c, d, and e.

Stellar characteristics
HD 164922 is a G-type main sequence star that is approximately 87% the mass of and 99% the radius of the Sun. It has a temperature of 5390 K and is about 10 billion years old, with estimates ranging as high as 13.4 billion years. In comparison, the Sun is about 4.6 billion years old and has a temperature of 5778 K.

The star is metal-rich, with a metallicity ([Fe/H]) of 0.16, or 144% the solar amount. This is particularly odd for a star as old as HD 164922. Its luminosity is 70% of the solar luminosity.

Planetary system 
On 15 July 2006, a long period Saturn-mass exoplanet was announced orbiting around HD 164922. This planet orbits at 2.11 AU from the star with a low eccentricity value of 0.05.

Almost exactly ten years later in 2016, another exoplanet, though less massive than the first planet, was discovered orbiting farther in from the star. This planet has a minimum mass of nearly 13 times that of Earth, meaning it is possibly a Neptune-like planet.

A third exoplanet, a hot super-Earth, was discovered in 2020, and a fourth, Neptune-mass, in 2021.

References

External links
 The Extrasolar Planet Encyclopedia: HD 164922
 SIMBAD: HD 164922
 

164922
088348
0700.2 and 9613
BD+26 3151
Hercules (constellation)
Planetary systems with four confirmed planets
G-type main-sequence stars
J18023085+2618471